Jasper Township may refer to:

Arkansas
 Jasper Township, Crawford County, Arkansas, in Crawford County, Arkansas
 Jasper Township, Crittenden County, Arkansas, in Crittenden County, Arkansas

Illinois
 Jasper Township, Wayne County, Illinois

Iowa
 Jasper Township, Adams County, Iowa
 Jasper Township, Carroll County, Iowa

Michigan
 Jasper Township, Michigan

Missouri
 Jasper Township, Dallas County, Missouri
 Jasper Township, Ozark County, Missouri, in Ozark County, Missouri
 Jasper Township, Jasper County, Missouri
 Jasper Township, Camden County, Missouri
 Jasper Township, Taney County, Missouri
 Jasper Township, Ralls County, Missouri

Ohio
 Jasper Township, Fayette County, Ohio

South Dakota
 Jasper Township, Hanson County, South Dakota, in Hanson County, South Dakota

Township name disambiguation pages